Diplotaxodon ecclesi is a species of haplochromine cichlid. It is endemic to Lake Malawi where it is found in open water at mainly at the deeper levels, although it is rarely caught by trawling. Its main prey is the Lake Malawi sardine (Engraulicypris sardella).

Etymology
The specific name honours the Senior Fisheries Research Officer of Malawi, David H. Eccles (b. 1932).

References

Fish of Malawi
ecclesi
Taxa named by Warren E. Burgess
Taxa named by Herbert R. Axelrod
Fish described in 1973
Taxonomy articles created by Polbot
Fish of Lake Malawi